Stegastes punctatus, commonly known as the blunt snout gregory, is a damselfish of the family Pomacentridae. Its range extends from the East African coast and the Red Sea to the Line Islands, the Society Islands, the Ryukyu Islands, the Bonin Islands, New Caledonia, Tonga and Micronesia. It is a very territorial species and drives other fish away from its "garden" of filamentous algae.

References

External links
 

punctatus
Fish described in 1825